Irene Pnevmatikos is an Australian politician. She has been a Labor member of the South Australian Legislative Council since the 2018 state election.

Pnevmatikos was a lawyer before her election, and is associated with the Left faction.

References

Year of birth missing (living people)
Living people
Members of the South Australian Legislative Council
Australian Labor Party members of the Parliament of South Australia
Women members of the South Australian Legislative Council
21st-century Australian politicians
21st-century Australian women politicians